Jean-Baptiste Morin may refer to:
 Jean-Baptiste Morin (mathematician) (1583–1656), French astrologer, mathematician and astronomer
 Jean-Baptiste Morin (composer) (1677–1745), French composer
 Jean-Baptiste Morin (politician) (1840–1911), Canadian politician

See also
Jean Morin (disambiguation)